is a Japanese coming-of-age manga series written and illustrated by Yumi Unita. It was serialized in Shogakukan's seinen manga magazine Monthly Ikki from November 2001 to April 2003, and its ten chapters were published in a single tankōbon volume in July 2003. It was adapted into a live action film that premiered in February 2015.

Characters

Media

Manga
Written and illustrated by Yumi Unita, Sukimasuki was serialized in Shogakukan's seinen manga magazine Spirits Zōkan Ikki (re-branded as Monthly Ikki in 2003) from November 30, 2001, to April 25, 2003. Shogakukan released a compiled tankōbon volume on July 30, 2003.

Live-action film
A live-action film adaptation was announced in October 2014. The film is directed by Kōta Yoshida and stars Exile's member Keita Machida as Heisaku and Kokone Sasaki as Fumio. The film premiered on February 7, 2015.

See also
Bunny Drop, another manga series by the same author

References

External links
Film official website 

Coming-of-age anime and manga
Films directed by Kōta Yoshida
Live-action films based on manga
Manga adapted into films
Romantic comedy anime and manga
Seinen manga
Shogakukan franchises
Shogakukan manga
2010s Japanese films